Liprin-beta-1 is a protein that in humans is encoded by the PPFIBP1 gene.

The protein encoded by this gene is a member of the LAR protein-tyrosine phosphatase-interacting protein (liprin) family. Liprins interact with members of LAR family of transmembrane protein tyrosine phosphatases, which are known to be important for axon guidance and mammary gland development. It has been proposed that liprins are multivalent proteins that form complex structures and act as scaffolds for the recruitment and anchoring of LAR family of tyrosine phosphatases. This protein was found to interact with S100A4, a calcium-binding protein related to tumor invasiveness and metastasis. In vitro experiment demonstrated that the interaction inhibited the phosphorylation of this protein by protein kinase C and protein kinase CK2. Alternatively spliced transcript variants encoding distinct isoforms have been reported.

Interactions
PPFIBP1 has been shown to interact with liprin-alpha-1.

References

Further reading